The Devil and Miss Jones is a 1941 comedy film starring Jean Arthur, Robert Cummings, and Charles Coburn. Directed by Sam Wood from a screenplay by Norman Krasna, the film was the product of an independent collaboration between Krasna and producer Frank Ross (Jean Arthur's husband). Their short-lived production company released two films through RKO Radio Pictures (Miss Jones and the later A Lady Takes a Chance released in 1943). The film was well received by critics upon its release and garnered Oscar nominations for Coburn and Krasna.

Plot
Cantankerous tycoon John P. Merrick goes undercover as a shoe clerk at "Neely's", one of his New York department stores, to identify agitators trying to form a union, after seeing a newspaper picture of his employees hanging him in effigy.

In the store he takes on a new persona, Thomas Higgins. After almost failing the minimum intelligence test he is sent to join the shoe department. There he befriends fellow clerk Mary Jones and her recently fired boyfriend Joe O'Brien, a labor union organizer. As time goes on, his experiences cause him to grow more sympathetic to his workers. He also starts to fall in love with sweet-natured clerk Elizabeth Ellis.

During a beach day at Coney Island with his coworkers, John begins to see a different side of Joe after he helps him avoid an arrest at a local police station by reciting the Bill of Rights and the Declaration of Independence. Afterwards John joins Joe, Elizabeth, and Mary on the beach, where he and Elizabeth nap until dark. Believing the two to be fully asleep, Joe and Mary discuss the union attempts and the future of their relationship. Unbeknownst to them, John listens in and after Joe leaves he pretends to awake, taking the opportunity to grab a list Joe dropped of employees willing to strike.

The remaining trio then travel home via subway, where John drops a card showing that his undercover persona was working for Merrick. This, along with other factors, causes Mary to come to the conclusion that John is a spy, and she tells Joe. Desperate to regain the list, Joe and Mary try unsuccessfully and they, along with John, end up in the store manager's office. Disgusted with the treatment of the employees, John berates the store manager, who is unaware of John's true identity. Emboldened by John, Mary declares that they have a list of 400 employees who will strike. The manager tricks the group into giving him the list. When they realize the manager's deceit, John and Mary take back the list and destroy it by eating it, after which Mary uses the intercom system to successfully encourage the entire store to strike.

In the following days, all of the employees picket Merrick's home. John decides to finally reveal his identity and has Mary, Elizabeth, and Joe meet him and his staff to discuss terms. They are initially unaware of his identity, but upon discovery, Joe faints, Mary screams, and Elizabeth stares up at John in disbelief as John asks her if she would be willing to go back on a statement she made about not wanting to marry a rich man. The film then cuts to a wedding party on a cruise liner, showing that there has been a joint wedding: John has married Elizabeth and Mary has married Joe. The party is made up of all of the store employees and it is shown that John has paid for all of them to take a Hawaiian vacation.

Cast
 Jean Arthur as Mary Jones, store clerk
 Charles Coburn as John P. Merrick, richest man in the world aka Thomas Higgins
 Robert Cummings as Joe O'Brien
 Edmund Gwenn as Hooper, section manager
 Spring Byington as Elizabeth Ellis, clerk
 S. Z. Sakall as George (Merrick's butler)
 William Demarest as First detective
 Walter Kingsford as Mr. Allison, store manager
 Montagu Love as Harrison
 Richard Carle as Oliver
 Charles Waldron as Needles
 Edwin Maxwell as Withers
 Edward McNamara as Police desk sergeant
 Robert Emmett Keane as Tom Higgins
 Florence Bates as store shopper
 Pat Flaherty as Mark - Policeman with pickpocket
 Irving Cummings
 Minta Durfee as Customer (uncredited)
 William Elmer as Attendant at Jim's bath house
 Frank Mills as Attendant at third bath house
 Victor Potel as Attendant at first bath house
 Walter Tetley as Stock boy

Production
Frank Ross and Norman Krasna decided to produce a movie together starring Jean Arthur (Ross' wife) based on a story by Krasna. The three formed a partnership and borrowed $600,000 from a bank to finance the film.

The script was written in ten weeks and then Sam Wood came on board as director. Krasna described the experience of making the film as one of the best in his career.

RKO agreed to distribute the film. It was Arthur's first film at RKO since The Ex-Mrs. Bradford. Robert Cummings was signed to play the male lead; he was shooting a film at MGM concurrently.

Shooting
Filming started 16 December 1940. It finished February 1941.

Filming had to stop for nine days so Robert Cummings could shoot extra scenes at MGM in Free and Easy in late January.

The film needed three days of retakes, which included adding a role for Montagu Love.

Box office
The film made a profit of $117,000.

Academy Award nominations
 Best Supporting Actor - Charles Coburn
 Best Original Screenplay - Norman Krasna

Adaptations to other media
On November 14, 1941, Philip Morris Playhouse presented a version of The Devil and Miss Jones on CBS radio. The adaptation starred Lana Turner. The story was also adapted as a radio play on two broadcasts of Lux Radio Theatre, first on January 19, 1942 with Turner and Lionel Barrymore, then on March 12, 1945 with Linda Darnell and Frank Morgan. It was also adapted twice on The Screen Guild Theater, first on June 7, 1943 with Laraine Day, Charles Coburn and George Murphy, again on August 12, 1946 with Van Johnson and Donna Reed. It was also adapted on the October 23, 1946 broadcast of Academy Award Theater, starring Charles Coburn and Virginia Mayo.

In 1950 Ross announced he wanted to make the film as a musical for his then wife Joan Caulfield. However, it was never made.

References

External links
 
 
 
 

Streaming audio
 The Devil and Miss Jones on Lux Radio Theatre: January 19, 1942
 The Devil and Miss Jones on The Screen Guild Theater: June 7, 1943
 The Devil and Miss Jones on Lux Radio Theatre: March 12, 1945
 The Devil and Miss Jones  on The Screen Guild Theater: August 12, 1946
 The Devil and Miss Jones on Academy Award Theater: October 23, 1946

1940s English-language films
1940s American films
1941 films
1941 romantic comedy films
1940s screwball comedy films
American black-and-white films
American romantic comedy films
American screwball comedy films
Fictional married couples
Films directed by Sam Wood
Films about the labor movement
Films scored by Roy Webb
Films set in department stores
Films set in Coney Island
Films set in New York City
RKO Pictures films
Workplace comedy films